The 12th Asian Championships in Athletics were held in Fukuoka, Japan in July 1998.

Medal summary

Men

Women

Medal table

See also
1998 in athletics (track and field)

External links
GBR Athletics

Asian Athletics Championships
Asian Championships
Asian Championships in Athletics
A
Asian Champion
International athletics competitions hosted by Japan